Alberto Talegalli (2 October 1913 – 10 July 1961) was an Italian film actor. He appeared in 37 films between 1952 and 1961. He was born in Pincano (Spoleto), Italy and died in Gualdo Tadino, in the province of Perugia, Italy.

Life and career 
After graduating from the liceo scientifico Talegalli became a bank clerk and a journalist for RAI television. After moving to Rome to pursue his passion for acting, he got the success thanks to Sor Clemente, a macchietta he created and successfully performed on stage, television, radio and in two comedy films by Camillo Mastrocinque. He died in a car accident, aged 47.

Selected filmography
 Siamo tutti inquilini (1953)
 Two Nights with Cleopatra (1953)
 Angels of Darkness (1954)
  The Country of the Campanelli (1954)
  Laugh! Laugh! Laugh! (1954)
 Love Song (1954)
 Three Strangers in Rome (1958)
 The Friend of the Jaguar (1959)
 Appuntamento a Ischia (1960)
 Who Hesitates is Lost (1960)

References

External links

 Franco Della Rosa, "Il Sor Clemente, o: Alberto Talegalli - ironico umorista umbro", http://www.grupporicercafotografica.it/GRF2017-7.pdf p. 9.

Italian male film actors
People from Spoleto
1913 births
1961 deaths
20th-century Italian male actors